Bathyclarias filicibarbis is a species of airbreathing catfish endemic to Lake Malawi, in the countries of Malawi, Mozambique and Tanzania.  This species grows to a length of 79.2 cm TL (31.2 inches).  This species can be found in the aquarium trade.

References
 

Bathyclarias
Fish of Africa
Fish described in 1959
Taxonomy articles created by Polbot